Rea is an album by Swiss pianist and composer Nik Bärtsch's band Ronin recorded in Zürich in 2003 and first released on the Tonus Music label.

Reception
On All About Jazz Budd Kopman noted "Rea has an overall sound in between that of Ronin's Stoa and Mobile's Aer".

Track listing
All compositions by Nik Bärtsch except where noted.
 "Modul 27" (Andreas Hunziker, Nik Bärtsch, Sha, Thomas Tavano) – 10:05  
 "Modul 22" – 16:38  
 "Modul 18" – 6:45  
 "Modul 26" – 18:14  
 "Modul 23" – 12:35

Personnel
 Nik Bärtsch – electric piano
 Björn Meyer – bass 
 Kaspar Rast – drums 
 Andi Pupato – percussion
 Sha – bass clarinet (tracks 1 & 4)
 Thomy Geiger – tenor saxophone (track 4) 
 Michael Gassmann – trumpet (track 4)

References

Nik Bärtsch albums
2004 albums